Oliver Jonathan Devoto (born 22 September 1993) is an English rugby union player, who plays for Exeter Chiefs as a utility back primarily as a centre and fly-half.

Early life
Devoto was born in Yeovil, Somerset and grew up in Sherborne in Dorset. The  Devoto surname is of Ligurian descent (ref reqd). Ollie was educated at The Gryphon School in Sherborne. Devoto started playing for his local club Sherborne RFC from when he was seven years old and stayed there through all of their age groups. While with Sherborne, Devoto represented Dorset & Wiltshire at under-16 and under-18 levels and played for the South West under-16 side. Devoto was picked up by the Bath Rugby academy at the age of 16, and was granted a sixth form scholarship at Bryanston School.

Club career

Bath Rugby: 2012–2016
An injury crisis during the 2012–13 season amongst Bath's backs saw Devoto promoted to the 1st XV squad, and he made his first team debut as a substitute in Bath's Premiership match against London Wasps on 8 September 2012.

On 1 March 2013, Devoto joined RFU Championship side Cornish Pirates on a dual-registration deal but didn't make an appearance for the Penzance-based club.

In March 2014, Devoto was named 2014 LV= breakthrough player for his performances in the 2014–15 LV Cup, as part of the award his former club Sherborne RFC received a £1,000 donation.

Devoto played for the vast majority of Bath's 2015 Premiership final loss to Saracens, replacing the injured Anthony Watson after seven minutes.

Exeter Chiefs: 2016–present
On 15 January 2016, Devoto signed for fellow Premiership side Exeter Chiefs on a three-year contract ahead of the 2016–17 season. He started the final as Exeter Chiefs defeated Wasps to be crowned champions of the 2016-17 English Premiership.

International career
Devoto having previously represented the England U19 development team, was called up to the England U20 side for the 2013 Six Nations Under 20s Championship. He made his debut off the bench as his side overcame France 40–10. After impressing in that performance, he was selected at full-back in the final two matches of the tournament, as his England side beat Italy and Wales to retain the Six Nations trophy. Devoto was then included in England's squad for the 2013 IRB Junior World Championship, scoring a try in England's record 109–0 victory over the United States. He was a replacement in the final as England triumphed over Wales and lifted the World Championship title.

In June 2014, Devoto was included in an England XV for their match against the Barbarians. Devoto came on as a replacement for his Bath teammate Jonathan Joseph and played for the last 21 minutes in England's 39–29 defeat. On 21 January 2015, Devoto was included in the England Saxons squad for the first time for a match against their Irish counterparts.

Devoto received his first call up to the senior England squad by new coach Eddie Jones on 13 January 2016 for the 2016 Six Nations Championship. On 29 May 2016, Devoto made his England debut as a substitute in England's 27–13 win against Wales.

After Harlequins' promising centre Joe Marchant was ruled out of the Argentina Tour through a toe injury, Devoto was called up as an injury replacement following a good performance in Exeter's 23-20 Aviva Premiership final win.

Devoto was selected as a substitute in England’s opening match against France in the 2020 Six Nations.

References

External links
Bath Rugby profile

Career stats at Statbunker

1993 births
Living people
Bath Rugby players
Cornish Pirates players
England international rugby union players
English people of Italian descent
English rugby union players
Exeter Chiefs players
People educated at Bryanston School
Rugby union fly-halves
Rugby union fullbacks
Rugby union players from Yeovil